Koolaburra is a privately held American importer of authentic sheepskin footwear founded in 1991. They are based in Santa Barbara, California. Koolaburra boots and shoes are currently made in Vietnam, and in the past have been made in Australia, Spain, Portugal, and China.

In 2005, they lost a lawsuit with Deckers Outdoor Corporation about the use of the term "ug" in reference to Australian sheepskin boots.

In 2015, Deckers Brands acquired the Koolaburra brand. Koolaburra made up the majority of Deckers' $26.9 million net sales in the third quarter of 2023.

References

External links
 Corporate Website

Shoe companies of the United States